Dabanlu may refer to:
 Dabanlu, Ardabil
 Dabanlu, Zanjan